Midville railway station was a station in Midville, Lincolnshire, England. It was on the line between Lincoln and Firsby. The station opened in 1913 and closed along with the line in 1970. The station building and masters house are now in private ownership.

References

Disused railway stations in Lincolnshire
Former Great Northern Railway stations
Railway stations in Great Britain opened in 1913
Railway stations in Great Britain closed in 1915
Railway stations in Great Britain opened in 1923
Railway stations in Great Britain closed in 1970
1913 establishments in England
Beeching closures in England